Avery may refer to:

Business 
 Avery Company, a former tractor manufacturer and later produced trucks and automobiles
 Avery Weigh-Tronix, a British manufacturer of industrial weighing systems
 Avery Berkel, a British manufacturer of retail weighing systems
 GEC Avery, a former British manufacturer of weighing machines (successor to W & T Avery)
 W & T Avery, a former British manufacturer of weighing machines
 Avery Brewing Company, a regional brewery located in Boulder, Colorado
 Avery Dennison, a major manufacturer of pressure-sensitive adhesive materials, apparel branding labels and tags, RFID inlays, and specialty medical products
 Avery Publishing, an imprint of the Penguin Group

People 
 Avery (given name), including fictional characters
 Avery (surname)

Places

United States 
 Avery, California
 Avery, Idaho
 Avery, Indiana
 Avery, Iowa
 Avery, Michigan
 Avery, Missouri
 Avery, Crawford County, Missouri
 Avery, Nebraska
 Avery, Ohio
 Avery, Oklahoma
 Avery, Texas
 Avery Township, Michigan
 Avery County, North Carolina
 Avery Creek, North Carolina
 Avery Island, Louisiana

Outer space 
 Avery (crater), a crater on the Moon
 3580 Avery, an asteroid

Other uses
 Avery (album), the 2015 debut album by Emtee

See also
 Avery Weigh-Tronix, manufacturer of weighing scales
 Avery Berkel, the predecessor of Avery Weigh-Tronix
 W & T Avery Ltd., the predecessor of GEC-Avery
 W. Avery & Son, a Victorian needle manufacturer 
 Avery Co., a historic farm tractor manufacturer

da:Dødsgardist#Dødsgardister og deres forbrydelser
sv:Dödsätare#Avery